En Vivo Obras 2001 is the third live album by Argentine band Almafuerte recorded and released in 2001.
It was recorded at the Estadio Obras Sanitarias in Buenos Aires.

Track listing
 Introducción
 Almafuerte
 Las aguas turbias suben esta vez
 Homenaje 
 Hombre peste
 1999
 Convide rutero
 El visitante
 Los delirios del defacto
 Amanecer en Open Door
 Del más allá
 De un mañana bajo tierra 
 El pibe tigre
 Lucero del alba 
 A vos amigo
 Popurrí
 Libre de temor

Personnel
Ricardo Iorio - vocals, bass
Claudio Marciello - guitars
Bin Valencia - drums

2001 live albums
Almafuerte (band) live albums
Spanish-language live albums
Live albums recorded in Buenos Aires